Ivan Petrella (born November 8, 1969) is an Argentine social theorist and liberation theologian. He is the Secretary of Culture in Argentina's Ministry of Culture and currently teaches at Universidad Torcuato Di Tella in Buenos Aires, Argentina. He was an associate professor in the Department of Religious Studies at the University of Miami in Coral Gables, Florida  and co-executive editor of the “Reclaiming Liberation Theology” book series with SCM Press.

Education 

Ivan Petrella holds a bachelor's degree from Georgetown University's School of Foreign Service, a Masters of Theological Studies from Harvard Divinity School and a Ph.D. in Religion and Law from Harvard University's Committee on the Study of Religion in the Graduate School of Arts and Sciences.

Theological views 

As an Argentine liberation theologian that is also agnostic, Petrella's scholarship cuts across religious studies departments and divinity schools, the United States and Latin America, and theology and the social sciences.  He is difficult to categorize. Historian Mario Aguilar notes that “for an Argentinean newspaper, he is a theologian, while for others in the United States he is a scholar of religion, two hats in one.” His work “marks the appearance of something new and something different within the discourse of liberation theology as a world phenomenon.”

Petrella is particularly interested in bridging the divide between different liberation theologies including black theology, Latin American liberation theology, Womanist theology and Hispanic/Latino(a) theology. He also argues that disciplines like economics, political science, and law need to be transformed in light of liberation theology's preferential option for the poor and envision undercover liberation theologians posing as social scientists to engage that task: “Here the liberation theologian need not carry the label ‘theologian’ and works best under a different disciplinary guise. Could the future of liberation call for the dissolution of liberation theology as an identifiable field of production?” He challenges those academic disciplines, which may operate in favour of the wealthy.

Public services 
He is the Secretary of Culture in Argentina's Ministry of Culture. Previously he was an elected representative in the City of Buenos Aires state legislature.

Selected bibliography

Petrella, Ivan (2008). Beyond Liberation Theology: A Polemic. London: SCM Press. 
Petrella, Ivan (2007). Theology for Another Possible World. London: SCM Press.
Petrella, Ivan (2006). The Future of Liberation Theology: An Argument and Manifesto. London: SCM Press. (Held in over 375 libraries according to WorldCat 
Petrella, Ivan (2005). Latin American Liberation Theology: The Next Generation. Maryknoll, NY: Orbis Books (Held in over 200 libraries according to WorldCat).
review: Theology. no. 856, (2007): 299
review : Journal of the American Academy of Religion, 75, no. 1 (2007): 223-227

Further reading
 Book Review of The Future of Liberation Theology by Alistair Kee

References

External links
 University of Miami faculty listing 
 Interview: La Nacion, July 16, 2008
 Interview: Revista Viva; Clarín, February 4 2006
 Interview: La Nacion, January 22, 2006

1969 births
Living people
Walsh School of Foreign Service alumni
Harvard Divinity School alumni
University of Miami faculty
Academic staff of Torcuato di Tella University
Liberation theologians
World Christianity scholars